This is an incomplete list of tourist attractions in Penang, Malaysia.

Beaches
 Batu Ferringhi
 Tanjung Bungah

Cultural enclaves
 Little India

Farms
 Tropical Fruit Farm

Galleries
 Hin Bus Depot

Hills
 Penang Hill
 Mertajam Hill (Bukit Mertajam Forest Park)

Historical buildings
 Cheong Fatt Tze Mansion
 City Hall
 Eastern & Oriental Hotel
 Eng Chuan Tong Tan Kongsi
 Fort Cornwallis
 Fort Cornwallis Lighthouse
 High Court
 India House
 Khoo Kongsi
 Old Protestant Cemetery
 Pinang Peranakan Mansion
 State Assembly Building
 Suffolk House
 The Residency
 Town Hall

Memorials
 Cenotaph
 Queen Victoria Memorial Clock Tower
 Francis Light Memorial

Museums
 Batik Painting Museum
 Camera Museum
 Penang Islamic Museum
 Penang Toy Museum
 State Museum and Art Gallery
 Sun Yat-sen Museum

Nature
 Botanic Gardens
 Penang National Park
 City Park

Zoos
 Entopia (Penang Butterfly Farm)
 Penang Aquarium
 Penang Bird Park

Religious places

Buddhist temples
 Dhammikarama Burmese Temple
 Wat Chaiyamangkalaram
 Wat Buppharam
 Mahindarama Temple
 Kek Lok Si
 Nibbinda Forest Monastery

Chinese/Taoist temples
 Goddess of Mercy Temple
 Snake Temple
 Thni Kong Tnua
 Eng Chuan Tong Tan Kongsi
 Khoo Kongsi

Churches
 Church of Divine Mercy
 Church of the Assumption
 Church of the Immaculate Conception
 Church of the Risen Christ
 Holy Spirit Cathedral
 St. Anne's Church
 St. George's Church

Hindu temples
 Arulmigu Balathandayuthapani Temple
 Arulmigu Karumariamman Temple
 Jalan Baru Sri Muniswarar Temple
 Nattukkottai Chettiar Temple
 Sree Maha Mariamman Devasthanam Temple
 Sri Aghora Veerapathra Temple
 Sri Mahamariamman Temple

Mosques
 Kapitan Keling Mosque
 Acheen Street Mosque
 State Mosque

Sport centres
 City Stadium
 Han Chiang Indoor Stadium
 SPICE Arena (Penang International Sports Arena)
 Penang Sports Club
 Penang State Stadium
 Penang Turf Club
 USM Stadium

Shopping centres
 1st Avenue Mall
 All Seasons Place
 Design Village
 GAMA Supermarket & Departmental Store
 Gurney Paragon
 Gurney Plaza
 Komtar
 M Mall O2O
 Penang Times Square
 Prangin Mall
 Queensbay Mall
 Straits Quay
 Sunshine Square
 Sunway Carnival Mall
 Udini Square

Skyscrapers

 8 Gurney
 BHL Tower
 Gurney Paragon
 Gurney Resort Hotel
 Komtar
 Mansion One
 MBf Tower
 Millennium Tower
 Setia V
 The Cove
 The Maritime

Theme Parks
 Teluk Bahang Escape Park

Festivals
Penang is also known for a wide variety of festivals, due to its vibrant multiethnic and multireligious society. Among the annual cultural and religious festivities in Penang are as follows.
 Chingay Parade
 Chinese New Year
 Jade Emperor's Birthday or Tian Gong Dan (天公誕)
 Chap Goh Meh
 Songkran
 Qingming Festival
 Wesak
 Thaipusam
 Thai Pongal
 Vaisakhi
 Feast of St. Anne
 Hari Raya Aidilfitri
 Hari Raya Aidiladha
 Awal Muharram
 Hungry Ghost Month
 Mid-Autumn Festival
 Deepavali
 Birthday of Prophet Muhammad
 Christmas

See also
 List of tourist attractions in Malaysia

References

Tourism in Malaysia
Tourist attractions in Penang
Penang